Monte Alegre de Minas is a Brazilian municipality located in the west of the state of Minas Gerais. The city belongs to the statistical mesoregion of Triângulo Mineiro and Alto Paranaíba and to the statistical microregion of Uberlândia. It became a municipality in 1870.

It is east of Uberlândia and south of the great hydroelectric station and reservoir of Itumbiara. Federal highway BR-365, which links the state boundary of Goiás to Pirapora in the north passes on the edge of the town.

Neighboring  municipalities are: Araporã and Tupaciguara to the north; Centralina to the west; Prata to the south, and Uberlândia to the east.

The main economic activities are industry, services, and agriculture, especially the growing of pineapple and sugarcane. The GDP in 2005 was R$209,000, with 73,000 from services, 7,000 from industry, and 120,000 from agriculture. There were tractors on 473 farms. The main crops were oranges, pineapple, bananas, sugarcane, soybeans, and corn. There were 132,000 head of cattle (2006) and over one million chickens.

The social indicators rank it in the top tier of municipalities in the state.
Municipal Human Development Index: 0.759 (2000)
State ranking: 215 out of 853 municipalities as of 2000
National ranking: 1,608 out of 5,138 municipalities as of 2000 
Literacy rate: 87%
Life expectancy: 70 (average of males and females)

The highest ranking municipality in Minas Gerais in 2000 was Poços de Caldas with 0.841, while the lowest was Setubinha with 0.568.  Nationally the highest was São Caetano do Sul in São Paulo with 0.919, while the lowest was Setubinha.  In more recent statistics (considering 5,507 municipalities) Manari in the state of Pernambuco has the lowest rating in the country—0.467—putting it in last place.

See also
 List of municipalities in Minas Gerais

References

External links
Cidade de Centralina

Municipalities in Minas Gerais